Dyego Wilverson Ferreira Sousa  (born 14 September 1989) is a professional footballer who plays as a forward for Primera División club Almería.

He spent most of his career in Portugal, making 128 appearances and scoring 41 goals in the Primeira Liga for Marítimo, Braga and Benfica. In the second tier, he played 66 games and scored 13 goals for four clubs.

Born and raised in Brazil, Sousa made his international debut for Portugal in 2019 and was part of their squad that won the 2018–19 UEFA Nations League.

Club career

Early career
Born in São Luís, Maranhão, Sousa began his career at his hometown team Moto Club de São Luís' youth setup before moving to Sociedade Esportiva Palmeiras in 2005, aged 15. Released by the club in the following year, he subsequently joined C.D. Nacional's under-20 squad after a trial period.

Sent back to Brazil in the middle of 2008 to nurse an injury, Sousa never returned to Nacional. In 2009, he returned to Moto Club and made his senior debut on 19 February, starting in a 2–1 Campeonato Maranhense away loss against São José de Ribamar Esporte Clube; his first goal for the club came on 23 April, in a 2–2 draw against the same opponent.

On 13 November 2009, Sousa joined Operário Ferroviário Esporte Clube, and made his debut for the club the following 17 January, by starting in a 1–0 home win against Cascavel Clube Recreativo, for the year's Campeonato Paranaense. He scored his first goal for the club on 31 March, netting his team's second in a 2–2 home draw against the same opponent, but was released in April after scoring only two goals.

Leixões
In July 2010, Sousa moved abroad for the second time, again to Portugal, joining Leixões S.C. of the Liga de Honra. He made his professional debut on 8 August, starting in a 0–0 away draw against C.D. Trofense, for the season's Taça da Liga; his first goal abroad occurred on 10 November, in a 2–1 loss at F.C. Paços de Ferreira, also for the league cup.

Sousa contributed with three goals in 14 appearances overall, as his side finished sixth.

Interclube
In June 2011, Sousa switched continents again, signing for G.D. Interclube in the Girabola of Angola. However, he failed to make a single appearance during his time at the club, as his international certificate never arrived; he subsequently terminated his contract with the club in early 2012, but still remained six months without a club.

Tondela / Portimonense
Sousa returned to Portugal's second tier in January 2012 with C.D. Tondela, being a regular starter during the campaign and scoring four times. The following year, he moved to fellow second division side Portimonense S.C. on 11 June, in a deal for two seasons.

At Portimonense, Sousa scored braces in home wins against Atlético Clube de Portugal (4–0) and C.S. Marítimo B (2–1), finishing his only year with seven goals overall.

Marítimo
On 13 July 2014, Sousa signed a three-year contract with Primeira Liga club C.S. Marítimo. In his first season on the island of Madeira he scored twice, both in a 4–0 home win over Boavista F.C. on 30 November, but the following campaign he recorded 12 goals and made the top ten scorers of the year. He also started six matches in the club's Taça da Liga run, that ended on 20 May 2016 with a 6–2 loss to S.L. Benfica in the final at the Estádio Cidade de Coimbra.

In August 2016 in a friendly against Tondela, Sousa attacked a linesman, and was given a nine-month ban by the Portuguese Football Federation in November, which was rescinded by a court the following month.

Braga
Sousa and compatriot teammate Fransérgio agreed on 31 January 2017 to transfer to S.C. Braga at the end of the season by which point he would be out of contract; he signed a four-year deal and Marítimo secured a share of any subsequent transfer fee.

On 12 August 2018, in the season opener, Sousa was one of three players to score two goals in a 4–2 win at home to C.D. Nacional. He scored a hat-trick on 14 December in a 4–0 win over C.D. Feirense also at the Estádio Municipal de Braga.

Sousa and teammate Paulinho were joint top scorers with four goals in the 2018–19 Taça da Liga with four goals each, including a third-minute strike in the defeat to eventual champions Sporting CP in the semi-final. On 6 March 2019, he signed a new contract until 2022, and finished the league campaign as Braga's top scorer (joint fourth overall) with 15 goals.

Shenzhen
After rejecting bids of €12–15 million in January, Braga sold Sousa to Chinese Super League club Shenzhen F.C. for €5.6 million in July 2019. In his third game, he scored his first two goals in a 4–0 home win over Guangzhou R&F F.C. on 14 August to escape the relegation zone.

On 31 January 2020, Sousa returned to Portugal's top flight, joining S.L. Benfica on loan without the option to sign. He debuted eight days later in a 3–2 loss at FC Porto in O Clássico, replacing André Almeida for the last five minutes. He made 13 scoreless appearances for the team from Lisbon, including 14 minutes of their 2–1 loss to Porto in the 2020 Taça de Portugal Final on 1 August.

Sousa signed for F.C. Famalicão on 5 October 2020. After five games and no goals in two months, he rescinded his deal and went back to China.

Almería
On 31 August 2021, Sousa agreed to a one-year contract with UD Almería in the Spanish Segunda División. Playing mostly from the bench, he contributed 24 games and five goals to their title-winning season, starting with a hat-trick in a 4–1 win at CD Mirandés on his first start on 24 October.

Sousa signed a new contract in March 2022, lasting until 2024. On 14 August he made his La Liga debut in a 2–1 home loss to Real Madrid, as a 71st-minute substitute for Umar Sadiq.

International career
On 15 March 2019, Sousa was called up to represent the Portugal national football team for the UEFA Euro 2020 qualifying campaign. He earned his first cap in a 0–0 draw against Ukraine on 22 March 2019 as a substitute replacing André Silva in the 73rd minute. He was part of Fernando Santos' squad that won the 2019 UEFA Nations League on home soil, but did not feature in either match.

Career statistics

Club

International

Honours
Almería
Segunda División: 2021–22

Portugal
UEFA Nations League: 2018–19

References

External links

1989 births
Living people
People from São Luís, Maranhão
Sportspeople from Maranhão
Naturalised citizens of Portugal
Portuguese people of Brazilian descent
Portuguese footballers
Portugal international footballers
Brazilian footballers
Brazilian emigrants to Portugal
Brazilian expatriate footballers
Brazilian expatriate sportspeople in Angola
Moto Club de São Luís players
Operário Ferroviário Esporte Clube players
Leixões S.C. players
G.D. Interclube players
C.D. Tondela players
Portimonense S.C. players
C.S. Marítimo players
S.C. Braga players
Shenzhen F.C. players
S.L. Benfica footballers
F.C. Famalicão players
UD Almería players
Primeira Liga players
Liga Portugal 2 players
Chinese Super League players
La Liga players
Segunda División players
Expatriate footballers in Angola
Expatriate footballers in China
Association football forwards
Portuguese expatriate footballers
Portuguese expatriate sportspeople in China
Brazilian expatriate sportspeople in China
UEFA Nations League-winning players